World No. 1 Caroline Wozniacki was the three-time defending champion and successfully defended her title, beating qualifier Petra Cetkovská 6–4, 6–1 in the final.

Seeds
The top two seeds received a bye into the second round.

Qualifying

Draw

Finals

Top half

Bottom half

External links
 WTA tournament draws

New Haven Open at Yale - Singles
Singles